National Route 272 is a national highway of Japan connecting Kushiro, Hokkaidō and Shibetsu, Hokkaidō in Japan, with a total length of 113.1 km (70.28 mi).

References

National highways in Japan
Roads in Hokkaido